Edward Settle Godfrey Jr. (1878–December 13, 1960), son of Edward Settle Godfrey, was a physician and epidemiologist, the founder of the first epidemiological society in the United States. He studied the epidemiology of diphtheria and tuberculosis. From April 21, 1936 until he retired on May 1, 1947, he was the New York State Commissioner of Health.

Awards and honors
 1951 Sedgwick Memorial Medal

References

American epidemiologists
1878 births
1960 deaths
Commissioners of Health of the State of New York